The S.N. Fyodorov Eye Microsurgery Complex is a clinical and research ophthalmological center in Moscow, Russia, founded in 1988 by Russian eye surgeon Svyatoslav Fyodorov. The center also includes regional branches in Cheboksary, Irkutsk, Kaluga, Khabarovsk, Krasnodar, Novosibirsk, Orenburg, Saint Petersburg, Tambov, Volgograd, and Yekaterinburg.

Led by Fyodorov until his death in 2000, the center became famous for the refractive surgery procedures performed in a way aimed to be similar to an assembly line, with patients on operating tables rotated from one doctor to another, each of them responsible only for one part of the procedure.
In the same years, Fyodorov converted a seagoing vessel, the Peter I, into an eye clinic, part of the institute, which sailed the Mediterranean and the Indian Ocean. Thanks to the international popularity of its founder and director, the Fyodorov Eye Microsurgery Complex obtained the fame of one of the best ophthalmic centers in the world, with eleven branches in regional locations. During the years, it welcomed the best medical doctors and surgeons from different countries wanting to specialize in ophthalmology. At present, the center treats cataract, refractive abnormalities, glaucoma, vitreal, retinal and optic nerve pathology, corneal diseases and deals with daily examinations of 1200 patients.

References

Buildings and structures in Moscow
Medical research institutes in Russia
Ophthalmology organizations
Eye hospitals
1988 establishments in the Soviet Union
Medical and health organizations based in Russia
Hospitals established in 1988
Medical research institutes in the Soviet Union
Hospitals built in the Soviet Union